"First of the Gang to Die" is a song written by Morrissey from his 2004 album You Are the Quarry.  It was released in July 2004 as the second single from the album. It was written by Morrissey along with Alain Whyte, the two being responsible for lyrics and music respectively. Following the success of "Irish Blood, English Heart", from the same album, the single reached the number six spot in the UK Singles Chart, giving Morrissey two top hits in a row for the first time since "The Last of the Famous International Playboys" and "Interesting Drug" both reached the top ten in 1989.

The single was A-Listed by BBC Radio 2 and received much more exposure than "Irish Blood, English Heart", propelling it onto the UK top 40 airplay chart. It entered the UK Singles Chart at number six, making it the third-highest-charting song and most successful follow-up single of Morrissey's career. The single stayed in the chart for seven weeks, longer than any other Morrissey single. Outside the United Kingdom, the song reached number 20 in Sweden and number 26 in Ireland, while becoming a minor hit in Germany and the Netherlands.

The song, which tells the story of a gang member named Hector, is seen as a tribute to Morrissey's significant Hispanic fanbase.

In October 2011, NME placed it at number 147 on its list "150 Best Tracks of the Past 15 Years".

Usage in media 
The second episode of The Mosquito Coast, an Apple TV+ drama series, is titled after the song and features a scene in which it is prominently used. The song also plays in the 2018 Marvel film Ant-Man and the Wasp.

Track listings
7-inch vinyl and CD (UK)
 "First of the Gang to Die"
 "My Life Is a Succession of People Saying Goodbye"

DVD
 "First of the Gang to Die" (live Manchester 22 May 2004) (video)
 "First of the Gang to Die" (audio)
 "Teenage Dad on His Estate" (audio)
 "Mexico" (audio)

CD (USA) and 12-inch vinyl (UK)
 "First of the Gang to Die"
 "My Life Is a Succession of People Saying Goodbye"
 "Teenage Dad on His Estate"
 "Mexico"

Personnel
 Morrissey: vocals
 Alain Whyte: guitar
 Boz Boorer: guitar
 Gary Day: bass
 Deano Butterworth: drums
 Roger Manning: keyboard

Charts

Weekly charts

Year-end charts

Certifications

Cover version
A cover version of the song was recorded by the singer Zee Avi, featured on her 2009 self-titled debut album.

See also
 Morrissey discography

References

Morrissey songs
2004 singles
Songs written by Morrissey
Songs written by Alain Whyte
2004 songs
UK Independent Singles Chart number-one singles
Songs about death
Songs about criminals